Valerico Laccetti or Valerio Laccetti (1836 – April 8, 1909) was an Italian painter, mainly of pastoral genre themes.

He was born in Vasto, Province of Chieti, and enrolled in the Academy of Fine Arts at Naples, where he won a prize at a competition. He studied under Giuseppe Mancinelli and Francesco Palizzi. He painted many landscapes of rural and agricultural scenes with animals. He also completed scenography, and painted in France and Austria.

In 1863, he exhibited Interior with Animals in Naples. He moved to Rome in 1865, and displayed Dog and Cat in a Stall and Cow in a Stall at the Mostre degli Amatori e Cultori. In 1870 at the Promotrice of Naples, he displayed Remembrance of Fontainebleau and Colosseum at Sunrise in Autumn. He exhibited at the Roman Exhibitions until 1902, including The Widow (1875); The Girl (1878); A Mother Plays With her Child (1879); The Prayer, La preghiera, Catechism in the Countryside (1881, province of Salerno); The Winter, New and Old Soldiers; and Le gioie della famiglia (1885). He exhibited often at the Neapolitan Promotrice (1871, 1873, 1874, 1879). In 1873 at Vienna, he displayed three canvases depicting peasants at work, and won a medal. In 1877 at the National exposition of Naples he displayed Solo!, Campagna romana, and La civiltà fuga l'ignoranza (Civilization banishes Ignorance), which was reprised at the next year's Paris International Exposition. After 1880, he also painted some historical and religious canvases influenced by Domenico Morelli, including Christus imperat! (completed 1884, exhibited in Rome, 1883 and 1888; now in Chieti, Pinacoteca Provinciale Barbella). He was an honorary member of the Academy of Fine Arts of Fologini and Ferrara.

He died in 1909 Rome.

References

1836 births
1908 deaths
19th-century Italian painters
19th-century Italian male artists
Italian male painters
20th-century Italian painters
20th-century Italian male artists
Painters from Naples
People from Vasto
Accademia di Belle Arti di Napoli alumni